De Col (or de Col) is a surname. Notable people with this surname include:

 Alessandro de Col, Italian double scull rower and medalist in team with Michelangelo Bernasconi
 Elettra de Col (born 1987), Italian curler
 Filippo De Col (born 1993), Italian football right defender

See also 

 Col (disambiguation)
 Da Col